Seyyed Baqer (also Romanized as Seyyed Bāqer) is a village in Shavur Rural District, Shavur District, Shush County, Khuzestan Province, Iran. At the 2006 census, its population was 735, in 124 families.

References 

Populated places in Shush County